Miroslav Bjeloš (born 29 October 1990) is a Serbian footballer who plays as a midfielder for Mladost Novi Sad.

Club career
At the beginning of his career, Bjeloš played with Metalac Futog, OFK Bačka and Radnički Šid. He played with Burlington SC in the Canadian Soccer League as a loaned player in 2013 and 2014. Returning in OFK Bačka, he helped the club secure a promotion to the Serbian SuperLiga in 2016. At the beginning of 2017, Bjeloš joined Limón F.C. In summer 2017, Bjeloš returned to OFK Bačka.

In summer 2019 after relegation he went to Napredak Kruševac In 2020, he signed with Újpest FC in the Nemzeti Bajnokság I. He played in the 2021–22 UEFA Europa Conference League against FC Basel.

References

External links
 
 
 

1990 births
Footballers from Novi Sad
Living people
Serbian footballers
Association football midfielders
OFK Bačka players
FK Radnički Šid players
Halton United players
Limón F.C. players
FK Napredak Kruševac players
Újpest FC players
Serbian First League players
Serbian SuperLiga players
Canadian Soccer League (1998–present) players
Nemzeti Bajnokság I players
Serbian expatriate footballers
Expatriate soccer players in Canada
Serbian expatriate sportspeople in Canada
Expatriate footballers in Costa Rica
Serbian expatriate sportspeople in Costa Rica
Expatriate footballers in Hungary
Serbian expatriate sportspeople in Hungary